Joseph Coulter (born June 8, 1990) is an American professional stock car racing driver.

Racing career

Early career
A native of Miami Springs, Florida, Coulter started his racing career in 1998, racing go-karts at West Coast Kart way in Naples, Florida. In 1999, Coulter entered the national Karting circuit in the WKA Horstman Gold Cup series while he was still competing in the Florida WKA Championship series. In his first two years of Karting Coulter won over 50 events, winning two state championships. In 2000, Coulter received CJ Marvin Sportsman of the year award. In 2005 he won the Summer Nationals at the G & J Kartway in Camden, Ohio. He also finished second National Championship and won both state championships in Florida running Briggs Junior light and heavy, and also won the Naples championship for the second year in a row.

In late 2005, he ventured into the Florida FASTRUCK racking up 4 top five finishes in his first 5 starts. In 2006, Coulter moved up to the FASTRUCK Pro series competing against more experienced veterans. In Coulter's first 8 races in the series, he won 4 races ultimately finishing 4th in the final points standings. Coulter started racing stock cars in 2007 entering the USAR Hooters Pro Cup Series. He didn't qualify for his first race at USA International Speedway but was permitted to race anyway and finished with a top 20.

Coulter started gaining attention in 2007 and 2008 by finishing in the top-ten multiple times throughout the Carolinas and Virginia, including top-tens at the 2007 Thanksgiving Classic at Kenly and the Baileys 300 at Martinsville Speedway. Coulter  also finished 4th at the Iowa Speedway Pro Cup Championship series event.

ARCA and NASCAR
2009 was Coulter's rookie season in the ARCA Re/Max Series. It was met with much success, as Coulter accumulated 7 top-five's, 13 top-ten's, 2 poles, led 156 laps and finished fourth in the point standings. In 2010, Coulter won his first ARCA race, beating Patrick Sheltra in the Berlin ARCA 200 on August 7 at Berlin Raceway after leading 54 of the 200 laps in the race.

Richard Childress Racing announced at the end of the 2010 racing season that Coulter would drive a second full-time Camping World Truck Series entry in 2011.

Coulter finished seventh in points at the end of the 2011 season, having scored 13 top-ten finishes, and beat Parker Kligerman and Nelson Piquet Jr. to win the series Rookie of the Year award. His 2012 Truck Series season started off with a wild ride, where his truck became airborne and flipped in the catch fence at Daytona. He won his first career NASCAR Camping World Truck Series race at Pocono Raceway on August 4, where he came from 3rd to 1st on the final restart, passing Piquet and James Buescher to take the win. The following race at Michigan International Speedway, Coulter collected his first career NASCAR Camping World Truck Series pole.

After finishing third in series points in 2012, Coulter moved to Kyle Busch Motorsports for the 2013 season, driving the No. 18 truck with crew chief Harold Holly. Coulter had a nightmare season in 2013, finishing a dismal 15th in points despite his top-notch equipment. For 2014, he moved to GMS Racing's No. 21, and improved to 7th in points.

After NASCAR
After finishing 7th in points in 2014 with GMS Racing, Coulter moved to the Team Relationships Coordinator position at GMS Racing. A lack of sponsorship funding left Coulter out of the seat for 2015. After leaving the organization, Coulter ran dirt late model events and also made his debut in a tour-type modified in 2020.

Personal life
In his free time Coulter likes to go fishing, go boating or working on race cars. Coulter is attending University of North Carolina at Charlotte (UNCC) for  business. On January 24, 2015, he married longtime girlfriend Jessica Green, who gave birth to their first child.

Motorsports career results

NASCAR
(key) (Bold – Pole position awarded by qualifying time. Italics – Pole position earned by points standings or practice time. * – Most laps led.)

Nationwide Series

 Ineligible for series points

Camping World Truck Series

ARCA Racing Series
(key) (Bold – Pole position awarded by qualifying time. Italics – Pole position earned by points standings or practice time. * – Most laps led.)

Whelen Modified Tour

References

External links
 
 

Living people
1990 births
Sportspeople from Miami-Dade County, Florida
Racing drivers from Florida
Racing drivers from Miami
NASCAR drivers
ARCA Menards Series drivers
CARS Tour drivers
University of North Carolina at Charlotte alumni
Richard Childress Racing drivers
Kyle Busch Motorsports drivers
Joe Gibbs Racing drivers